Caroline Cave is a Canadian film, television and stage actor, known for her roles in the films This Beautiful City, One Week, The War Bride, Six Figures and Saw VI, and the television series Cra$h & Burn. She has also had guest roles in The L Word, Haven, Stargate Atlantis, Kevin Hill, The Associates, Dirk Gently's Holistic Detective Agency,  and Die neue Prophezeiung der Maya (End of the World) in 2013.  She co-starred in the 2015 Lifetime TV movie Accidental Obsession.

Her stage roles have included productions of Pamela Gien's The Syringa Tree, Joanna McClelland Glass' Trying, Stephen Sachs' Miss Julie: Freedom Summer and David Eldridge's Festen.

Filmography

Film

Television

Awards
She won the Gemini Award for Best Actress in a Drama Series for Cra$h & Burn at the 2010 Gemini Awards.

She won a Dora Award in 2004 for her Toronto performance in The Syringa Tree, and a Jessie Award in 2006 for her Vancouver performance in the same play.

References

External links

Living people
Actresses from Vancouver
Canadian film actresses
Canadian television actresses
Canadian stage actresses
Dora Mavor Moore Award winners
Best Actress in a Drama Series Canadian Screen Award winners
Year of birth missing (living people)